The Prix Albert-Tessier is an award by the Government of Quebec that is part of the Prix du Québec, given to individuals for an outstanding career in Quebec cinema. It is awarded to script-writing, acting, composing music, directing, producing and cinematographic techniques. It is named in honour of Albert Tessier.

Winners

References

External links
 Award winners 

Quebec film awards
Prix du Québec
Awards established in 1980